The 2014 California Secretary of State election was held on November 4, 2014, to elect the secretary of state of California. Incumbent Democratic secretary of state Debra Bowen was term-limited and ineligible to run for re-election to a third term in office.

A primary election was held on June 3, 2014. Under California's nonpartisan blanket primary law, all candidates appear on the same ballot, regardless of party. In the primary, voters may vote for any candidate, regardless of their party affiliation. The top two finishers — regardless of party — advance to the general election in November, even if a candidate manages to receive a majority of the votes cast in the primary election. Washington is the only other state with this system, a so-called "top two primary" (Louisiana has a similar "jungle primary").

Democrat Alex Padilla and Republican Pete Peterson finished first and second, respectively, and contested the general election, which Padilla won.

Primary election

Candidates

Democratic Party

Declared
 Derek Cressman, political reform and anti-dark money activist and former vice president of Common Cause
 Jeffrey H. Drobman, computer scientist/engineer
 Alex Padilla, state senator

Withdrew
 Leland Yee, state senator

Republican Party

Declared
 Roy Allmond, California state employee
 Pete Peterson, executive director of the Davenport Institute for Public Engagement at Pepperdine University

Green Party

Declared
 David S. Curtis, architectural designer

Independent

Declared
 Daniel Schnur, former chairman of the California Fair Political Practices Commission and former Republican strategist

Polling

Results

General election

Polling

Results

References

External links
California Secretary of State election, 2014 at Ballotpedia
Campaign contributions at FollowTheMoney.org

Official campaign websites
Derek Cressman for Secretary of State
David S. Curtis for Secretary of State
Alex Padilla for Secretary of State
Pete Peterson for Secretary of State
Daniel Schnur for Secretary of State
Leland Yee for Secretary of State

Secretary of State
California Secretary of State elections
November 2014 events in the United States
California